Kaymaz can refer to:

 Kaymaz
 Kaymaz, Boğazkale
 Kaymaz, Yapraklı